Ilanga furtiva is a species of sea snail, a marine gastropod mollusk in the family Solariellidae.

Description
The size of the shell attains 6 mm.

Distribution
This species occurs in the Indian Ocean off KwaZuluNatal, South Africa

References

External links
 To World Register of Marine Species

furtiva
Gastropods described in 1987